Carex filicina is a tussock-forming species of perennial sedge in the family Cyperaceae. It is native to parts of Asia from Pakistan in the north west to Indonesia in the south east.

See also
List of Carex species

References

filicina
Plants described in 1834
Taxa named by Christian Gottfried Daniel Nees von Esenbeck
Flora of Pakistan
Flora of China
Flora of Bangladesh
Flora of Borneo
Flora of Christmas Island
Flora of Hainan
Flora of India
Flora of Assam (region)
Flora of Java
Flora of Indonesia
Flora of Laos
Flora of Malaysia
Flora of Myanmar
Flora of Nepal
Flora of the Philippines
Flora of Sri Lanka
Flora of Sulawesi
Flora of Sumatra
Flora of Taiwan
Flora of Thailand
Flora of Tibet
Flora of Vietnam